Boonyasak is a Thai surname. Notable people with the surname include:

Daran Boonyasak (born 1979), Thai actress
Laila Boonyasak (born 1982), Thai actress, sister of Daran

Thai-language surnames